Beck's Brewery, also known as Brauerei Beck & Co., is a brewery in the northern German city of Bremen. In 2001, Interbrew bought Brauerei Beck for 1.8 billion euros; at that time it was the fourth largest brewer in Germany. US manufacture of Beck's has been based in St. Louis, Missouri, since early 2012.

Since 2008, it has been owned by the Interbrew subsidiary Anheuser-Busch InBev SA/NV.

Beck's logo with a key is based upon the city of Bremen's coat of arms, which contains a key attributed to the patron saint of the city, Saint Peter.

See also

References

External links
 Official international site
 Heinrich Brugsch 1876 trip to the city of Philadelphia: Beck's Bier wins top prize
 Vintage Beck's Beer Advertisement from 1921

AB InBev brands
Breweries in Germany
Beer brands of Germany
Companies based in Bremen
Manufacturing companies based in Bremen (state)
German companies established in 1873